Mattingly may refer to:

 David Mattingly (disambiguation), multiple people
 David Burroughs Mattingly (born 1956), American illustrator
 David Mattingly (archaeologist) (born 1958), British historian and author
 Don Mattingly (born 1961), American baseball player and coach
 Earl Mattingly (1904–1993), American baseball player
 Garrett Mattingly (1900–1962), American historian
 Harold Mattingly (1884–1964), British historian
 Ignatius Mattingly (1927–2004), American linguist
 Jimmy Mattingly is a fictional character in the movie That Thing You Do!
 Ken Mattingly (born 1936), American astronaut
 Lenora Mattingly Weber (1895–1971), American author
 Mack Mattingly (born 1931), American politician 
 Marie Mattingly Meloney (1878-1943), American reporter, magazine editor, and socialite
 Mary Mattingly (born 1978), American artist
 Nace Mattingly (1921-2000), former NASCAR Cup Series driver
 Sylvan Mattingly (1882–1951), American Roman Catholic teacher
 Terry Mattingly (born 1954), American author

Places
 Mattingly, Kentucky, United States
 Mattingly Settlement, Ohio, United States

See also
 Mattingley, a village and civil parish in Hampshire, England

English-language surnames